Törő is a surname. Notable people with the surname include:

Szabolcs Törő (born 1983), Hungarian handballer
András Törő (born 1940), American canoer